Coslada is a city and municipality in the autonomous community of Madrid in central Spain.

The  is located in Coslada, which has become a major logistics hub in the country. Due to the area's close proximity to the Madrid–Barajas Airport and the Dry Port, the stretch of industrial cities from Madrid to Guadalajara along the A-2 freeway (known as the Corredor del Henares and more recently the "golden mile" of online sales) has, since the 1990s, grown into a logistics hub, similar to East Midlands in England, with the entire area now boasting 5.7 million m² of logistics space in total. With investment from foreign funds and socimis, the logistics sector has grown rapidly thanks to increases in internet shopping. As Coslada runs out of space, other logistics companies have started to move into nearby cities such as Marchamalo, San Fernando de Henares, and Torija.

A large percentage of Coslada's population works at the airport. Most Spanish transportation and shipping companies have branch offices in Coslada; the city is host to 706 logistics companies, the most in the country. El Corte Inglés operates a distribution center in the city, and delivery company Nacex opened a new distribution center in November 2018.

Area and population 

 Area: 11.7 km²
 There are 102,890 inhabitants.
 Migration: there are 17,000 foreign-born inhabitants, who represent 12% of the total population. Most are Romanians, though there are also small numbers of Chinese, Latin Americans, Guineans, Vietnamese and Indians.
 Population density: 6,907.8/km²
 Inhabitants of Coslada are called Cosladeños.

Location and transportation 

 Coslada is located at 40,25° North, 3,32° West.
 12 kilometres east of downtown Madrid, Coslada is part of the metropolitan area.
 The city is surrounded by other municipalities such as Madrid and San Fernando de Henares.
 Coslada is covered and connected to the Madrid metropolitan area by the line (L7) of the Madrid Metro in May 2007, local and regional bus lines, a commuter trains line (C-1,C-2 and C-7) and several major freeways (A-2 (Madrid-Barcelona), M-40,M-45,M-50) and toll highways (R-3).

Health care 
The Hospital Universitario del Henares, located in Coslada, provides medical attention to the municipality as well as to San Fernando de Henares, Mejorada del Campo, Loeches and Velilla de San Antonio.

Notable people 
Dani Parejo, footballer
Amaia Salamanca, actress

References

External links

Ayuntamiento de Coslada, Town Hall of Coslada.
Concursos de Coslada Tramitaciones, concursos y tramites de estudio en Coslada.
Coslada en Google Maps

 
Municipalities in the Community of Madrid